Son of Ali Baba is a 1952 American adventure film directed by Kurt Neumann and starring Tony Curtis and Piper Laurie.  According to the film's trailer, it was made in response to thousands of letters in response to The Prince Who Was a Thief wanting to see Curtis and Laurie together again.

Plot
In medieval Persia, Kashma Baba is a military cadet by day, and a roisterer by night. The morning after a rowdy banquet, Kiki, an escaped slave, takes shelter under Kashma's roof. Word comes that the wicked Caliph is looking for her; but Kashma, by this time in love, flees with her to his father's palace. Alas, there's more to Kiki than meets the eye. Will the evil schemers succeed? The sons of the Forty Thieves to the rescue!

Cast
 Tony Curtis as Kashma Baba
 Piper Laurie as Princess Azura of Fez / Kiki 
 Susan Cabot as Tala
 William Reynolds as Mustapha
 Hugh O'Brian as Hussein
 Victor Jory as Caliph
 Gerald Mohr as Capt. Youssef
 Robert Barrat as Commandant
 Leon Belasco as Babu
 Morris Ankrum as Ali Baba

References

External links 

1952 films
Films directed by Kurt Neumann
Universal Pictures films
1950s action adventure films
Films based on Ali Baba
American action adventure films
1950s English-language films
1950s American films